Viktor Igorevich Sysoyev (born 21 December 1994) is a Russian football midfielder and politician.

Biography
He made his debut in the Russian Football National League for FC Dynamo Saint Petersburg on 23 October 2013 in a game against FC Mordovia Saransk.
 
He is a son of Lyubov Yegorova. In 2016, he was elected a member of the Legislative Assembly of Saint Petersburg, representing the Liberal Democratic Party of Russia.

References

External links
 Career summary by sportbox.ru

1994 births
Living people
Russian footballers
FC Dynamo Saint Petersburg players
Russian sportsperson-politicians
Liberal Democratic Party of Russia politicians
Association football midfielders